John Flynn may refer to:

John Flynn (Australian politician) (born 1953), former Australian politician
John Flynn (baseball) (1883–1935), professional baseball player
John Flynn (cricketer) (1890–1952), Australian cricketer
John Flynn (director) (1932–2007), American film director
John Flynn (footballer, born 1948), English footballer
John Flynn (Gaelic footballer) (born 1984), Wicklow Gaelic footballer
John Flynn (Irish politician) (died 1968), Fianna Fáil politician from Kerry
John Flynn (minister) (1880–1951), Minister and the founder of the Royal Flying Doctor Service of Australia
John Flynn (Marvel Cinematic Universe), fictional character
John Flynn (New Brunswick politician) (born 1954)
John Flynn (rugby league), rugby league footballer who played in the 1900s, for England, and Broughton Rangers
John E. Flynn (1912–2003), American politician from New York
John Gerrard Flynn, former British ambassador to Venezuela, the Dominican Republic and Haiti, and Angola
John T. Flynn (1882–1964), American journalist and author
Johnny Flynn (born 1983), musician
John P. Flynn, United States Air Force general
John Flynn Jr., Wisconsin politician

See also
John Flinn (born 1954), former baseball player
John Flinn (politician) (died c. 1900), former politician and prison warden in Nova Scotia, Canada
Jonny Flynn (born 1989), basketball player
John Flynt (1914–2007), U.S. Representative from Georgia